Island council elections were held in the Netherlands Antilles in 1959. They were the third elections for the Island Council.

Aruba

Four parties participated, three of which had participated in 1955; the Aruban Patriotic Party (PPA), Aruban People's Party and the Aruba National Union. The Christian Democratic Party, a breakaway from the PPA, also contested the elections and won a single seat.

Results

Sint Maarten

General elections were held in Sint Maarten on 25 May 1959. The result was a victory for the Democratic Party, which won four of the five Island Council seats.

Results

References

Netherlands Antilles island council